Amsterdam is an unincorporated community in Merced County, California.

A post office operated at Amsterdam from 1893 to 1895, from 1900 to 1910, with a closure during part of 1906, and from 1912 to 1925.

References

Unincorporated communities in California
Unincorporated communities in Merced County, California